The Trofeo de Campeones de la Liga Profesional is an official national football cup of Argentina organized by the Argentine Football Association (AFA), and contested by the winners of Primera División and Copa de la Liga Profesional. 

The competition is successor of Trofeo de Campeones organised by defunct Superliga Argentina, which was only played once.

Overview 
The first edition was planned to be held in 2020 but it was suspended due to the COVID-19 pandemic therefore the trophy was first contested in 2021 when River Plate (2021 Primera División champion) and Colón (2021 Copa de la Liga Profesional champion) faced each other. The match was held in Estadio Único Madre de Ciudades in Santiago del Estero on December 18, 2021. River Plate beat Colón 4–0, winning their first Trofeo de Campeones title.

In October 2022 AFA determined that the postponed 2020 edition will be held on 1 March 2023. As Boca Juniors won both, 2019–20 Primera División and 2020 Copa LPF, River Plate and Banfield (runner-ups of the aforementioned competitions) will play a semifinal (on 22 Feb 2023) to define the rival of Boca Juniors.

As winner of both competitions, 2022 Copa de la Liga Profesional and 2022 Primera División, Boca Juniors secured a place in the final for the 2022 edition.

List of champions 

Notes

References 

a
c